Yevgeni Vladimirovich Strelov (born 5 June 1999) is a Russian football player.

Club career
He made his debut in the Russian Professional Football League for FC Mordovia Saransk on 27 May 2018 in a game against FC Ural-2 Yekaterinburg. He made his Russian Football National League debut for Mordovia on 7 April 2019 in a game against FC Avangard Kursk.

References

External links
 Profile by Russian Professional Football League

1999 births
Sportspeople from Nizhny Novgorod
Living people
Russian footballers
Association football defenders
FC Mordovia Saransk players
FC Shinnik Yaroslavl players
FC Khimik Dzerzhinsk players
Russian First League players
Russian Second League players